Beren may refer to:
Steve Beren
Beren (political party), a political party in Kyrgyzstan
Beren Erchamion, fictional hero in J. R. R. Tolkien's Middle-earth legendarium
Beren (given name), a Turkish female given name